Sindisiwe van Zyl (née Masunda; 3 April 1976 – 10 April 2021), was a Zimbabwean-born South African physician, radio DJ, columnist, health activist and researcher known for using social and mainstream media to share HIV-related, mental health, reproductive health, other medical and public health information. She won several awards for her work.  Because of her extensive public health advocacy, she was known as "the people's doctor".

Early life and education
Van Zyl was born on 3 April 1976 in Salisbury, Rhodesia (now Harare, Zimbabwe). For secondary education she attended Arundel School. For tertiary education she attended the University of Pretoria, where she obtained a Bachelor of Science in human physiology and psychology and a Bachelor of Medicine, Bachelor of Surgery degree. Dr Sindisiwe Van Zyl interned at Chris Hani Baragwanath Hospital. In 2004, she married Marinus van Zyl.

Career
She used Twitter, mainly, to inform and engage about HIV particularly prevention of mother-to-child transmission. She also appeared frequently on TV, radio and other media platforms. She shared about her personal journey with depression and physician burnout. Dr. van Zyl chronicled how she lost 41 kg while on a Banting diet. She was a natural short sleeper requiring about 4 hours of sleep per night while functioning normally. Her scientific research has included guidelines to support HIV-affected individuals and couples to achieve pregnancy safely and COVID-19 and HIV co-infection. She held various roles in the South African Medical Association. She was a member of Médecins Sans Frontières Southern Africa's Board of directors. Because of her extensive public health advocacy, she was known as "the people's doctor".

Her media affiliations included:
 Columnist for Health24, Bona magazine, Choma magazine
 Radio DJ, Kaya FM hosting Sidebar with Sindi
 Guest artist in the soap opera 7de Laan

Death
On 10 April 2021, she died at the age of 45 from COVID-19. Her funeral was on 15 April 2021. Memorials of Dr Sindi included people posting themselves on social media wearing dresses with pockets, which was her signature style.

Awards and honors
 Mail & Guardian (2012) 200 Young South Africans
Glamour Women of the Year (2018) - awarded for excellence and activism in health and medicine
Amref Health Africa posthumous Africa Health Agenda International Conference 2023 Women in Global Health Award

References

External links 
 

1976 births
2021 deaths
21st-century South African physicians
21st-century women physicians
Alumni of Arundel School
Deaths from the COVID-19 pandemic in South Africa
People from Harare
South African columnists
South African physicians
South African radio presenters
South African women columnists
South African women radio presenters
South African women physicians
University of Pretoria alumni
Zimbabwean emigrants to South Africa